Amin Gaon railway station is a small railway station in Guwahati, Assam. Its code is AMJ. It serves Guwahati City. The station consists of 2 platforms.

References

External links

Railway stations in Guwahati
Lumding railway division